NLSC may refer to:
 National Land Surveying and Mapping Center
 National Language Service Corps
 National Leadership and Skills Conference
 Supreme Court of Newfoundland and Labrador